Repton is a small town in New South Wales, Australia, located near the mouth of the Bellinger River.

A railway station on the North Coast line was open between 1916 and 1974.

Schools
 Repton Public School

References

Mid North Coast
Towns in New South Wales
Coastal towns in New South Wales
Bellingen Shire
North Coast railway line, New South Wales